Bruno Vinícius Souza Ramos, known as Bruno Tabata (born 30 March 1997) is a Brazilian footballer who plays as an attacking midfielder for Palmeiras.

Club career

Early career
Born in Ipatinga, Tabata began playing at local clubs Aciaria FC and Usipa, before joining Atlético Mineiro's youth setup in 2014.

Portimonense
He signed for Portuguese club Portimonense in 2016 and made his professional debut for the side in a Segunda Liga match against Sporting B, on 6 August 2016.

Sporting CP
On 29 September 2020, Tabata joined Sporting CP on a five-year contract.

Career statistics

Honours
Portimonense
Segunda Liga: 2016–17

Sporting CP 
Primeira Liga: 2020–21
Taça da Liga: 2020–21
Supertaça Cândido de Oliveira: 2021

Palmeiras 
Campeonato Brasileiro Série A: 2022

References

External links

1997 births
People from Ipatinga
Living people
Brazilian footballers
Portimonense S.C. players
Sporting CP footballers
Sociedade Esportiva Palmeiras players
Brazilian expatriate footballers
Brazilian expatriate sportspeople in Portugal
Expatriate footballers in Portugal
Primeira Liga players
Liga Portugal 2 players
Campeonato Brasileiro Série A players
Association football midfielders
Brazil youth international footballers
Sportspeople from Minas Gerais